Grool may refer to:

Fiction
Grool (monster), see List of Goosebumps episodes
Grool, planet on Bubble and Squeak (video game)

Surname
Josef Grool, character played by Peter Outerbridge
Greg Van Grool, see 2008 ASA Midwest Tour season

Other
 Grool, slang for vaginal lubrication

See also

 Gruel, a food